Lulia Lulia is a Cook Islands international rugby league footballer who played in the 2013 World Cup.

Playing career
Lulia plays for the Shellharbour Sharks.

In 2013, Lulia was named in the Cook Islands squad for the World Cup.

References

External links

1985 births
Living people
Australian rugby league players
Australian people of Cook Island descent
Cook Islands national rugby league team players
Shellharbour City Dragons players
Rugby league wingers
Rugby league players from Sydney
Rugby league second-rows